Cevizağacı is a village in the Beytüşşebap District of Şırnak Province in Turkey. The village is populated by Assyrians who adheres to the Chaldean Catholic Church and had a population of 76 in 2021.

Cevizağacı is situated at the foot of the Kato mountain.

History 
The village was populated by Assyrians but abandoned by the 1990s when the whole population bar the muhtar migrated to Belgium. Three families had by the early 2010s resettled in the village. In 2019, it was reported that eight families had returned to the village.

In August 2022, Mamxûran Kurds from neighboring villages returned land in the village to the returning Assyrians peacefully after having seized the land after its abandonment.

References

Further reading 

 

Villages in Beytüşşebap District
Assyrian communities in Turkey